Sir Pope Alexander Cooper  (12 May 184630 August 1923) was an attorney-general and a chief judge of the Supreme Court of Queensland, Australia.

Early life
Pope Alexander Cooper was born at Willeroo Station, Lake George, New South Wales, the son of Francis Cooper, a squatter, and his wife Sarah, née Jenkins. Cooper was educated at the Sydney Grammar School and the University of Sydney, where he won the Cooper and Gilchrist scholarships and graduated with a B.A. and in 1868 a M.A. He then went to London where he completed the LL.B. course, became a student of the Middle Temple, and was called to the English bar in June 1872.

Career
Cooper returned to Australia and began to practise as a barrister at Brisbane in June 1874. He became a crown prosecutor in January 1879 and entered the Legislative Assembly of Queensland as member for Bowen. On 31 December 1880 he joined the first Thomas McIlwraith ministry as Attorney-General. He resigned this position on 6 January 1883 when he was appointed as a supreme court judge for the northern district of Queensland. His travelling expenses caused some quarrels. In 1895 he became senior puisne judge at Brisbane, and on 21 October 1903 chief justice. There was animosity between the Labor government and the judges, playing out through a series of cases challenging government actions and legislation. The parliament undermined his security of tenure by passing the Judges Retirement Act 1921 (Qld), the effect of which was that immediately upon proclamation three out of six judges, Cooper and Justices Real and Chubb were compulsorily retired, which permitted the government to appoint new judges, including Thomas McCawley as the new Chief Justice. Cooper died on 30 August 1923.

Legacy
In 1873, Cooper married Alice Frener, daughter of James Cooper who died in 1900 leaving a son and two daughters. He was knighted 1904 and was created a KCMG in 1908. He was chancellor of the University of Queensland from 1915 to 1922.

Cooper had only a short career in parliament but made himself a reputation as a polished speaker. As a judge he was always seeking the essentials of a case and generally adopted a common attitude on legal questions. His summings up were usually brief and to the point. In criminal cases he could be severe though just. In his conduct of the court, though always courteous, he insisted that the dignity of the bench must be upheld, and he was quick to restrain anything in the nature of contempt of court.

See also
 Judiciary of Australia
 List of Judges of the Supreme Court of Queensland
 Family tree - Francis Cooper 1811-1885 (his father)

References

 at gutenberg.net.au
Cooper, Sir Pope Alexander  — Brisbane City Council Grave Location Search

External links

1848 births
1923 deaths
Australian Knights Commander of the Order of St Michael and St George
Australian politicians awarded knighthoods
Chief Justices of Queensland
Members of the Queensland Legislative Assembly
Burials at Toowong Cemetery
Attorneys-General of Queensland
Colony of Queensland judges
Colony of Queensland people
19th-century Australian judges
20th-century Australian judges
Judges of the Supreme Court of Queensland